This is a list of flag bearers who have represented Seychelles at the Olympics.

Flag bearers carry the national flag of their country at the opening ceremony of the Olympic Games.

See also
Seychelles at the Olympics

References

Seychelles at the Olympics
Seychelles
Olympic flagbearers
Olympic flagbearers